Spermatid perinuclear RNA-binding protein is a protein that in humans is encoded by the STRBP gene.

References

Further reading